"Stormtrooper in Drag" is the debut single by Paul Gardiner, who was the bass player in Gary Numan's backing band (and in Numan's first band, Tubeway Army). Numan is featured on the single as a co-composer, producer, musician and vocalist.

Production background
Though the single was released under Gardiner's name alone in 1981, it is often credited as Paul Gardiner featuring Gary Numan, and appears on a number of Numan's compilation albums. Numan not only played on and produced the recording but also co-composed and sang lead vocals. It was published by Numan Music and released by Numan's then-current label, Beggars Banquet.

The track was the first product released by Numan, or any of the former members of his backing band, following his 'farewell' concerts at Wembley Arena in April 1981. It also marked the first time in their four years of working together that the friends and former Tubeway Army bandmates had collaborated in the writing of a published song. The result was a departure from the electropop sound that had been Numan's trademark, featuring a vocal performance and sonic textures that foreshadowed his next album, Dance. Gardiner and Numan were credited with guitar and bass, respectively, contrary to their usual practice; both also played synthesizers while Numan's adopted brother, John Webb, played drums.

The single made No. 49 in the UK charts in 1981. The 12" cut was a promo-only version on standard black vinyl; its tracks, their mixes and durations, were identical to the 7" single.

B-side
The B-side, "Night Talk", was another Gardiner/Numan co-composition which, unlike the A-side, would appear on Numan's September 1981 studio album, Dance. Whereas "Stormtrooper in Drag" featured conventional percussion, "Night Talk" made extensive use of a drum machine, the Linn LM-1. Both songs referenced drugs, the former describing "needles in arms", the latter concerning a man dealing with a lover who is an addict (Gardiner was himself a heroin user, while Numan always claimed abstinence from drugs).

Versions
"Stormtrooper in Drag" is included on numerous Gary Numan albums including the CD reissue of Dance and the compilations New Man Numan: The Best of Gary Numan (1982), Exhibition (1987) and The Premier Hits (1996). A live version appears on his album Dark Light (1995); this was recorded in 1994, the tenth anniversary of Gardiner's death (Numan also played live the B-side, "Night Talk", as a 20th anniversary memorial in 2004). It was covered by Saint Etienne for the Numan tribute album Random (1997); an edited version of this performance also appeared on their album Continental. Terre Thaemlitz recorded a piano version on the tribute album Replicas Rubato (1999).

Track listing
 "Stormtrooper in Drag" (Paul Gardiner, Gary Numan) – 4:48
 "Night Talk" (Gardiner, Numan) – 4:19

Production credits
 Producers:
 Gary Numan
 Musicians:
 Paul Gardiner: Guitar, Keyboards (ARP Odyssey), Backing vocals
 Gary Numan: Vocals, Keyboards (ARP Odyssey), Bass, Guitar, Linn LM-1 ("Night Talk")
 John Webb: Drums ("Stormtrooper in Drag")
 Sean Lynch: Linn LM-1 ("Night Talk")

References
 Paul Goodwin (2004). Electric Pioneer: An Armchair Guide to Gary Numan

1981 songs
1981 debut singles
Gary Numan songs
Songs written by Gary Numan
Beggars Banquet Records singles